Fossombronia foveolata is a species of liverwort belonging to the family Fossombroniaceae.

It is native to Europe and America.

References

Fossombroniales